The 2019 Ford EcoBoost 200 is a NASCAR Gander Outdoors Truck Series race held on November 15, 2019, at Homestead-Miami Speedway in Homestead, Florida. Contested over 134 laps on the 1.5 mile (2.4 km) oval, it was the 23rd and final race of the 2019 NASCAR Gander Outdoors Truck Series season.

Background

Track

Homestead-Miami Speedway is a motor racing track located in Homestead, Florida. The track, which has several configurations, has promoted several series of racing, including NASCAR, the Verizon IndyCar Series, the Grand-Am Rolex Sports Car Series and the Championship Cup Series.

Since 2002, Homestead-Miami Speedway has hosted the final race of the season in all three of NASCAR's series: the Sprint Cup Series, Xfinity Series and Gander Outdoors Truck Series. Ford Motor Company sponsors all three of the season-ending races; the races have the names Ford EcoBoost 400, Ford EcoBoost 300 and Ford EcoBoost 200, respectively, and the weekend is marketed as Ford Championship Weekend. The Xfinity Series (then known as the Busch Series) has held its season-ending races at Homestead since 1995.

Entry list

Practice

First practice

Final practice

Qualifying
Qualifying was cancelled due to rain. Stewart Friesen was awarded the pole for the race due to his win in the previous week's race.

Qualifying results

. – Championship 4 driver

Race
Note: Stewart Friesen, Ross Chastain, Brett Moffitt, and Matt Crafton were not eligible for stage points as they were competing for the championship.

Summary
Stewart Friesen started on pole, but Ross Chastain quickly pressured him and overtook him by the first lap. However, he was unable to pull away from Friesen and the two built up a large lead over the remainder of the field. Austin Hill caught up to them and overtook Chastain to take the stage win.

Brett Moffitt won the race off pit road after Hill was blocked. Chastain caught up to Moffitt in a similar manner he did to Friesen at the beginning of the race. Hill again caught up to the leaders and passed them, remaining in the lead to take the second stage win.

On lap 51, a caution was thrown for Ray Ciccarelli leaking fluid onto the track. Christian Eckes moved to the front on slightly worn tires. In the final round of green flag pit stops, Eckes pitted 10 laps before the others, while Hill stayed out for an extra 9 laps before pitting. Friesen was hit by Angela Ruch while entering his pit stall, costing him significant time. He later lacked long run speed, eliminating his chances of winning.

Hill won the race by around 1.5 seconds over Matt Crafton, who became the 2019 champion despite not winning a single race during the season. Eckes finished third, giving Kyle Busch Motorsports the owner's championship. Chastain finished fourth and Moffitt finished fifth.

Joe Nemechek, who started 23rd and finished 14th, broke Richard Petty's all-time start record across NASCAR's top 3 series, starting his 1,186th NASCAR race.

Stage Results

Stage One
Laps: 40

Stage Two
Laps: 40

Final Stage Results

Stage Three
Laps: 54

. – Driver won the championship

. – Playoffs driver

References

Ford EcoBoost 200
Ford EcoBoost200
NASCAR races at Homestead-Miami Speedway